The 2022–23 Detroit Red Wings season is the 97th season for the National Hockey League (NHL) franchise that was established on September 25, 1926. It is the Red Wings' sixth season at Little Caesars Arena. This will be the Red Wings' first season under new head coach Derek Lalonde.

Off-season
On June 30, 2022, Derek Lalonde was named head coach following the departure of Jeff Blashill.

Standings

Divisional standings

Conference standings

Schedule and results

Preseason

Regular season

Awards and honours

Awards

Milestones

Roster

Transactions
The Red Wings have been involved in the following transactions during the 2022–23 season.

Trades

Free agents

Signings

Draft picks

Below are the Detroit Red Wings' selections at the 2022 NHL Entry Draft, which was held on July 7 and 8, 2022, at the Bell Centre in Montreal.

Notes:
 The Washington Capitals' second-round pick went to the Detroit Red Wings as the result of a trade on April 12, 2021, that sent Anthony Mantha to Washington in exchange for Richard Panik, Jakub Vrana, a first-round pick in 2021 and this pick.
 The Vegas Golden Knights' fourth-round pick went go to the Detroit Red Wings as the result of a trade on October 7, 2020, that sent a fourth-round pick in 2020 (125th overall) to Vegas in exchange for this pick.
 The Colorado Avalanche's fourth-round pick went to the Detroit Red Wings as the result of a trade on April 9, 2021, that sent Patrik Nemeth to Colorado in exchange for this pick.
 The Los Angeles Kings' seventh-round pick went to the Detroit Red Wings as the result of a trade on March 20, 2022, that sent Troy Stecher to Los Angeles in exchange for this pick.

References

Detroit Red Wings
Detroit Red Wings
Detroit Red Wings
Detroit Red Wings seasons